ADIF (an acronym of Administrador de Infraestructuras Ferroviarias) is a Spanish state-owned railway infrastructure manager.  This state owned company reports to the Ministry of Transport, Mobility and Urban Agenda. ADIF is charged with the management of most of Spain's railway infrastructure, that is the track, signalling and stations. It was formed in 2005 in response to European Union requirements to separate the natural monopoly of infrastructure management from the competitive operations of running train services. It is the legal successor of Renfe, Feve (Ferrocarriles de Vía Estrecha), and GIF (Gestor de Infraestructuras Ferroviarias).

Founding
ADIF is the result of Railway Sector Act, which arises from the transposition of European Directives. It requires that large European national railway independently manage the infrastructure and trains on it. The ultimate goal was to allow any other rail operator operating on the network to do so on equal terms with the operator, in this case, Renfe, promoting free competition. 
The Renfe division became effective on 1 January 2005 between the two companies:
Renfe (newly created entity): Owner of trains and responsible for its circulation, which works in competition with other railway companies
ADIF (Legal successor of Renfe): Owner of infrastructure and responsible for its management, which provides its services to any rail operator who requests
A similar operation was conducted on 31 December 2012 with Feve, a company that managed the narrow gauge railways. ADIF took charge of all narrow gauge infrastructures not transferred to the autonomous governments.

Operations
ADIF is responsible for administrating rail infrastructures (tracks, stations, freight terminals, etc.), managing rail traffic distributing capacity to rail operators, and the collection of fees for infrastructure, station and freight terminal use

Current High-Speed Rail Lines in Spain

High-Speed Rail Lines under construction in Spain

León - Asturias (Pajares New Line). Length: 49.7 km
Venta de Baños - Burgos - Vitoria. Length: 200.4 km
Vitoria - Bilbao - San Sebastián. Length: 176.5 km (including accesses to cities)
Madrid – Castile-La Mancha – Valencia Region – Murcia Region. Length: 955 km (603 in service and 352 under construction)
Extension of Madrid Southern Access-Torrejón de Velasco
High-speed Mediterranean Corridor. Murcia-Almería section. Length: 184.4 km (not including the Murcia Railway Network)
Antequera-Granada. Length: 125.7 km
Madrid - Extremadura - Portuguese Border. Estimated length: 450 km
Madrid: Atocha-Chamartín connection. Length: 8.2 km

Financial information

References

External links

 Official site
 Líneas, the official Adif magazine
  ADIF Economic and management information

Railway companies of Spain
Companies established in 2005
Railway infrastructure managers
Government-owned companies of Spain
2005 establishments in Spain